Rudolf Grauer (20 August 1870, Hellbrunn, Salzburg – 17 December 1927, Vienna) was an Austrian explorer and zoologist.

He conducted zoological investigations in British East Africa (present-day Uganda) in 1905, German East Africa in 1907, and in the Belgian Congo (1910–11). In 1910 he was among the first Europeans to come in contact with the Mambuti. His African collections are housed at the Naturhistorisches Museum in Vienna.

Eponymy
Birds:
Grauer's broadbill, Pseudocalyptomena graueri
Grauer's cuckooshrike, Coracina graueri
Grauer's swamp warbler, Bradypterus graueri
Grauer's warbler, Graueria vittata

Mammals:
Grauer's large-headed shrew, Paracrocidura graueri
Eastern lowland gorilla, Gorilla beringei graueri

Reptiles:
Grauer's blind snake, Rhinotyphlops graueri
Rwanda five-toed skink, Leptosiaphos graueri

Amphibians:
Grauer's puddle frog (Rugege river frog), Phrynobatrachus graueri

Fish:
Bathybates graueri

References 

1870 births
1927 deaths
Scientists from Salzburg
Austrian zoologists
Austrian explorers